Pyrithyldione (Presidon, Persedon) is a psychoactive drug invented in 1949.
An improved method of manufacture was patented by Roche in 1959. It was used as a hypnotic or sedative and presumed to be less toxic than barbiturates. Today, this substance is no longer used. Agranulocytosis was sometimes reported as adverse effect. Pyrithyldione is also a CYP2D6 inducer but is not as potent as glutethimide In studies, it increased the O-Demethylation of codeine by 20%.

See also 
 Methyprylon
 Piperidione
 Glutethimide

References 

Hypnotics
Lactams
Ketones
GABAA receptor positive allosteric modulators
Abandoned drugs